Jelen beer is a pale lager produced by the Apatin Brewery from Serbia that belongs to American-Canadian concern Molson Coors. It contains 4,6% alcohol and belongs to the class of light lagers. Jelen has won various awards within Serbia and participates in a variety of sponsorships. Its logo is a bugling red deer; jelen means deer.

Brands 
Jelen pivo
Jelen Cool company's light non-alcoholic beer.
Jelen Fresh Lemon beer with only 2% of alcohol mixed with lemon juice.
Jelen Fresh Grapefruit beer mixed with grapefruit juice

Awards 
 Monde Selection 2010 – Big golden medal (for the 12th time) and golden medal for quality (for the 3rd time)
 Most Popular Product with Men – the result of the poll conducted by Moja Srbija (My Serbia) Citizens’ Association in 2009
 Best beer of the Beer Fest  – by votes of audience for the 6th time since 2004
 The Best Beer Brand from Serbia 2010 in the beverage category in a campaign conducted by the Ministry of Trade and Services, Serbian Chamber of Commerce and business daily Privredni Pregled.
 Most Popular Beer in Serbia –the result of the poll conducted by Moja Srbija (My Serbia) Citizens’ Association in 2010

Sponsorship
Since 2008, Jelen has been the general sponsor of the Guča Trumpet Festival and owner of the Jelen Top 10, one of the national pop-rock TV shows. It is the organizer of the Jelen Live Festival.

See also
 Beer in Serbia

References

External links
 Company website
 Jelen Football
 History of Apatin Brewery

Beer in Serbia
1756 establishments in Europe
Food and drink companies established in 1756
Serbian brands
Molson Coors brands